Compliance can mean:

Healthcare
 Compliance (medicine), a patient's (or doctor's) adherence to a recommended course of treatment
 Compliance (physiology), the tendency of a hollow organ to resist recoil toward its original dimensions (this is a specific usage of the mechanical meaning)
 Pulmonary compliance (or lung compliance), change in lung volume for applied or dynamic pressure
 Compliance (psychology), responding favorably to a request offered by others

Other uses
 Compliance (film), released in 2012
 Compliance (song), single from the 2022 studio album by the English rock band Muse
 Compliance, in mechanical science, is the inverse of stiffness
 Compliant mechanism, a flexible mechanism
 Environmental compliance, conforming to environmental laws, regulations, standards and other requirements
 Regulatory compliance, adherence to standards, regulations, and other requirements
 Compliance with web standards

See also 
 Governance, risk management, and compliance